Carey Olsen is an offshore law firm with offices in Bermuda, the British Virgin Islands, Cape Town,  Cayman Islands, Guernsey, Jersey, London, Hong Kong and Singapore advising on Bermuda, British Virgin Islands, Cayman Islands, Guernsey and Jersey law. 

The firm employs more than 450 people and its 59-plus partners head up a total complement of 235 lawyers.  It provides legal services in relation to all areas of banking and finance, corporate and M&A, investment funds and private equity, trusts and private wealth, dispute resolution, insolvency and property law.

Carey Olsen works with clients including global financial institutions, investment funds, private equity houses, multi-national corporations, public organisations, sovereign wealth funds, ultra high net worth individuals, family offices, directors, trustees and private clients.  It also routinely works alongside all of the major onshore law firms, accountancy firms and insolvency practitioners on corporate transactions and matters involving its jurisdictions.

History 

Carey Olsen was formed in 2003 following the merger between two prominent Channel Island firms, Carey Langlois in Guernsey and Olsens in Jersey. The former had roots dating back to 1898 while Olsens was, at the time, a relative newcomer having been started in 1981 by Advocate Anthony Olsen.

Offices 

 Bermuda
 British Virgin Islands
 Cape Town
 Cayman Islands
 Guernsey
 Hong Kong
 Jersey
 London
 Singapore

Rankings 

The Corporate Advisers Rankings Guide places Carey Olsen in the top five law firms by the number of London Stock Exchange (LSE) and AIM clients it advises. It is the only offshore law firm to be ranked alongside UK legal advisers in the top five.

References 

Offshore law firms
Offshore magic circle